The Aromanians in Greece are an Aromanian ethno-linguistic group native in Epirus, Thessaly and Western and Central Macedonia, in Greece.

In the country, they are commonly known as "Vlachs" (Βλάχοι, Vláchoi) and referred to as "Vlachophone Greeks" or "Vlach-speaking Greeks", because most Aromanians in Greece have a Greek identity and identify themselves with the Greek nation and culture.

Culture
The Aromanians of Greece count with the Panhellenic Federation of Cultural Associations of Vlachs, a cultural organization of Aromanians.

Music

Cuisine

List of settlements

Notable Aromanians from modern Greece

Academics
 Anastasios Pichion, educator, fighter in the Greek Struggle for Macedonia

Art and literature
 Yanaki Manaki (1878-1954) - photography and cinema pioneer
 Milton Manaki (1882-1964) - photography and cinema pioneer

Military
 Konda Bimbaša (1770-1813) - Serbian revolutionary
 Giorgakis Olympios (1772-1821) - armatolos and military commander during the Greek War of Independence
 Mitre the Vlach (1873-1907) - IMRO commander
 Vassilis Rapotikas (1888-1943) - Aromanian revolutionary

Philanthropy
 Georgios Sinas (1783-1856) - businessman
 Evangelis Zappas (1800-1865) - businessman
 Konstantinos Zappas (1814-1892) - benefactor
 Simon Sinas (1810-1876) - businessman
 George Averoff (1818-1899) - businessman and philanthropist

Politics
 Rigas Feraios (1757-1798), writer, political thinker and revolutionary (possible Aromanian origin)
 Ioannis Kolettis (1773-1847) - Prime Minister of Greece
 Petros Zappas, member of the Greek Parliament (1915–17) for the Argyrokastron Prefecture
 Alexandros Papagos (Aromanian mother) (1883-1955), Hellenic Army officer and Prime Minister
 Alcibiades Diamandi (1893-1948) - Leader of Principality of the Pindus and later of the Roman Legion
 Nicolaos Matussis (1899-1991) - lawyer, politician and leader of the Roman Legion
 Evangelos Averoff (1910-1990) - Greek minister and leader of the New Democracy party
 Michael Dukakis (Aromanian mother) (1933-) - American Governor of Massachusetts and former presidential candidate
 Andreas Tzimas, communist politician
 Alexandros Svolos, jurist and president of the Political Committee of National Liberation (unofficial Prime Minister)
 Yannis Boutaris (1942-) - businessman, politician and mayor of Thessaloniki

Religion
 Nektarios Terpos (end 17th-18th century) - priest and author
 Theodore Kavalliotis (1718-1789) - priest and teacher

Science
 Elie Carafoli (1901-1983)- engineer and aircraft designer

See also
 Aromanians in Albania
 Aromanians in Bulgaria
 Aromanians in North Macedonia
 Aromanians in Romania
 Aromanians in Serbia
 Principality of the Pindus
 Roman Legion (1941–1943)
 Great Vlachia
 Hellenization
 Vlach Folklore Museum, Serres

References

 
Ethnic groups in Greece